Maximilian Stiepl (March 23, 1914 – August 27, 1992) was an Austrian speed skater who competed in the 1936 Winter Olympics and in the 1948 Winter Olympics.

In 1936 he won the bronze medal in the 10000 metres competition. In the 1500 metres event as well as in the 5000 metres competition he finished fifth.

Twelve years later he finished tenth in the 10000 meters event, 24th in the 5000 meters competition and 38th in the 1500 meters event.

World record 

Source: SpeedSkatingStats.com

References 

 Profile

1914 births
1992 deaths
Austrian male speed skaters
Olympic speed skaters of Austria
Speed skaters at the 1936 Winter Olympics
Speed skaters at the 1948 Winter Olympics
Olympic bronze medalists for Austria
World record setters in speed skating
Olympic medalists in speed skating
Medalists at the 1936 Winter Olympics
World Allround Speed Skating Championships medalists